Worldwide Records bhojpuri also known as WWR is an Indian independent record label based in Mumbai. It was founded by Ratnakar Kumar and others in April 2001. The company also distributed “Ministry of Sound” from UK in India. Wordwide Records produces CDs, remixes of dramas, television films, movies, and music.

History 
Worldwide Records introduced lounge music in India with the launch of the world-renowned Buddha Bar and Claude Challe music series. In 2009, Telecom operators in India were associated with the music distribution of the company. It distributed music for BBC World News TV on Reliance Mobile. Worldwide Records operates as a VAS Service Provider for Indian Telecom Operators.

In 23 May 2003, Worldwide group partnered with the Fashion TV India as a marketing partner to showcase a new show called Fashion on TV.

In 2016 the company ventured into regional markets with major work in Bhojpuri language and film productions. Ratnakar Kumar, Signed with music director Arya Sharma for his movie, directed By Parag Patil, co-produced by Kuldeep Srivastav, Produced By Ratnakar Kumar.

Worldwide Records bhojpuri distributes music in different languages including Punjabi, Marathi, Gujarati and, Haryanvi.

Artists 

 Alimchand Prakash
 Biba Singh
 Bikramjit Singh
 Bhai Satwindar Singh Ji Machhiware
 Chintoo Singh
 Dr. Soma Ghosh
 Goa Gil
 Javed Ali
 JSR Madhukar
 Kunal
 Mitali Chaudhary
 Pandit Rupak Kulkarni
 PT. Bhavani Shankar
 PT. Ronu Majumdar
 Raj Kumar Rizvi
 Roop Kumar Rathod, Ritu Johri
 Sangeeta Vyas
 Sanjay Wandrekar
 Ustad Sultan Khan
 Vijay Batalvi 
 Arbesham
 Amit Trivedi

Notable Albums

See also 

 Lists of record labels

References

External links 
 Worldwide Records Official Site

Record labels
Music publishing companies